Arredol (English: "Around") was an electronic newspaper written in the Aragonese language. The newspaper was founded on 19 September 2011 and at the time was the first digital news source written entirely in Aragonese. The project was open to contributions from readers themselves who may provide news, articles, and images.

The language model used by Arredol is the standardized spelling of the Academia de l'Aragonés, which is supported by most institutions and associations to be more in keeping with the etymology and medieval Aragonese.

Upon the launch of the newspaper, its editors were Chorche Burgos Romance, Lucía Marco López and Carlos García.

All contents of this newspaper Arredol was published under the Creative Commons Attribution-ShareAlike 3.0.

See also 
 List of newspapers in Spain

References

External links

2011 establishments in Spain
Aragonese-language newspapers
Mass media in Zaragoza
Newspapers published in Aragon
Publications established in 2011
Spanish news websites
Aragonese-language mass media